Cosmic Adventure is Scott Tixier's second album. It was recorded at Avatar Studios in New York, produced by Donald Brown, following his debut album Brooklyn Bazaar. The single "Dig It (feat. Pedrito Martinez) was available in August 2016 and the full album released on September 9, 2016 by Sunnyside Records.

On August 15, 2016, "Dig It" and "100,000 Hours" were featured on NPR for the show Morning Edition hosted by David Greene, during This Week in Politics.

Morning Edition is among the highest rated public radio shows.
On September 1, the album was featured by the Archives of African American Music and Culture (AAAMC) in the Black Grooves September issue.

Cosmic Adventure was selected one of the Best Albums of 2016 by DownBeat magazine.

Track listing

"Maze Walker (feat. Pedrito Martinez)" – 4:11
"Dig It (feat. Pedrito Martinez)" – 6:14
"100,000 Hours" – 4:53
"Troublant Bolero" – 5:23
"Mr Tix" – 5:31
"Misty" – 4:21
"Nil's Landing" – 3:50
"King of Sorrow" – 6:12
"Beam Me to Mars (feat. Chris Potter)" – 5:58

Personnel 
Scott Tixier – violin
Yvonnick Prene – harmonica
Glenn Zaleski – piano
Luques Curtis – bass
Justin Brown – drums
Pedrito Martinez – congas
Chris Potter  – tenor saxophone

Liner notes 
"Listening to Scott's playing makes me very happy because the future of modern jazz violin is in very good hands. He displays a musical maturity in this album which is surprising considering his young age, drawing inspiration from deep inside and not rehashing what others have played before him, which makes his style original. He is surrounded by great players, all top musicians who help make this album a strong musical statement." – Jean-Luc Ponty

Technical credits 

Dave Darlington - Mixing/Mastering
François Zalacain - Executive Producer
Donald Brown - Producer
Franck Bohbot - Photography
Zach Harter - Graphic Design
Rachel Foley - Set Design
Jean-Luc Ponty - Liner Notes
Corelli Savarez - Executive Producer
Schertler Group - Executive Producer

Release history

References

External links 
 Official artist website
 Official record label website

2016 albums
Scott Tixier albums
Sunnyside Records albums